The 2004 French Figure Skating Championships took place between 20 and 21 December 2003 in Briançon. Skaters competed at the senior level in the disciplines of men's singles, women's singles, pair skating, ice dancing, and synchronized skating. The event was used to help determine the French team to the 2004 World Championships and the 2004 European Championships.

Results

Men

Ladies

Pairs

Ice dancing

External links
 results

French Figure Skating Championships, 2004
French Figure Skating Championships, 2004
French Figure Skating Championships
Figure Skating Championships
Figure Skating Championships